Jokin Murguialday Elorza (born 19 March 2000) is a Spanish cyclist, who currently rides for UCI ProTeam .

Major results
2019
 1st San Gregorio Saria
 1st Premio de San Pedro de Irún
2020
 National Under-23 Road Championships
2nd Road race
2nd Time trial
 6th Overall Tour of Bulgaria
 8th Overall Giro Ciclistico d'Italia
2021
 3rd Overall Troféu Joaquim Agostinho
1st Young rider classification

References

External links

2000 births
Living people
Spanish male cyclists
Cyclists from the Basque Country (autonomous community)
Sportspeople from Biscay